Teresa del Valle Murga (born 1 April 1937 in San Sebastián) is a Spanish anthropologist, best known for her work in the fields of gender studies and feminism in Spain, in her publications Mujer vasca. Imagen y realidad (1985), Culturas oceánicas: Micronesia (1987), Género y sexualidad (1991), Gendered Anthropology (1993), and Perspectivas feministas desde la antropología social (2000). She was the recipient of a Emakunde Award for Equality in 2010.

References 

1973 births
Living people
Spanish anthropologists
Spanish writers
Spanish feminists